"For A Little While" is a song written by Steve Mandile, Jerry Vandiver and Phil Vassar, and recorded by American country music artist Tim McGraw.  It was released in November 1998 as the sixth and final single from his album Everywhere.  The song peaked at number 2 on the Billboard Hot Country Singles & Tracks chart but reached number-one on the Canadian RPM Country Tracks chart.

Content
The song is about a man's wistful reminiscing, particularly one summer season that he spent with a woman who is no longer with him.

Critical reception
Deborah Evans Price, of Billboard magazine reviewed the song favorably, saying that the "gentle rolling piano, sturdy fiddle, and out-in-front guitar work make the strong melody come alive, but McGraw's vocal is what really sells this song." Kevin John Coyne of Country Universe gave the song a B grade, saying that compared to the other singles from this album, this one is the "most frothy and least substantial." He proceeded saying that it could be "the most historically significant of the singles, given that it’s the blueprint for countless Kenny Chesney hits that followed."

Chart performance
The song debuted at number 74 on the Hot Country Singles & Tracks chart dated November 7, 1998. It charted for twenty weeks on that chart, and peaked at number 2 on the chart dated February 6, 1999. It also peaked at number 37 on the Billboard Hot 100.

Year-end charts

Other versions
Phil Vassar, who co-wrote the song, recorded a version of it for his 2006 album, Greatest Hits, Vol. 1.

References

1998 singles
Tim McGraw songs
Songs written by Phil Vassar
Song recordings produced by Byron Gallimore
Song recordings produced by James Stroud
Songs written by Jerry Vandiver
Curb Records singles
1997 songs
Songs written by Steve Mandile